Bonto Bulaeng is a village in Sinoa district, Bantaeng Regency in South Sulawesi province, Indonesia. Its population is 2260.

Climate
Bonto Bulaeng has a tropical monsoon climate (Am) with little rainfall from August to October and heavy to very heavy rainfall in the remaining months.

References

Villages in South Sulawesi